"Gjaku im" is a song recorded by Albanian singer and songwriter Elvana Gjata released as the last single from her second studio album, Afër dhe Larg (2011). The song was written by Dalina Buzi and composed by Flori Mumajesi.

Background and composition 

An Albanian-language pop rock song, "Gjaku im" has a running time of three minutes and fifty six seconds and is lyrically a manifesto that focuses on raising awareness about violence against women. It was written by Albanian writer Dalina Buzi and composed by Elvana's regular collaborator Albanian singer and songwriter Flori Mumajesi. In terms of the music notation, the song was composed in  time performed in the key of G minor in common time with an andante moderato tempo of 96 beats per minute.

Promotion 

An accompanying music video for "Gjaku im" officially premiered onto Elvana Gjata's YouTube channel on 28 April 2012, preceded by a teaser released three days prior. The aforementioned was later deleted due to unknown reasons and re-uploaded to Youtube on 20 November 2014. However, "Gjaku im" was released on digital platforms and to streaming services as a single on 20 November 2013 through Threedots Productions.

Release history

References 

2012 singles
2012 songs
Elvana Gjata songs
Albanian-language songs
Pop rock songs
Songs written by Flori Mumajesi